WD 2359-434 (Gliese 915, LHS 1005, L 362-81) is a nearby degenerate star (white dwarf) of spectral class DAP5.8, the single known component of the system, located in the constellation Phoenix, the nearest star in this constellation.

Distance

WD 2359−434, probably, is the 11th closest white dwarf, or, possibly, 9th, 10th, or 12th (see Gliese 293, GJ 1087 and Gliese 518). Currently, the most accurate distance estimate of WD 2359−434 is trigonometric parallax from CTIOPI (Cerro Tololo Inter-American Observatory Parallax Investigation) 0.9 m telescope program, published in 2009 in the 21st paper of RECONS's The Solar Neighborhood (TSN) series Subasavage et al. 2009: 122.27 ± 1.13 mas, corresponding to a distance 8.18 ± 0.08 pc, or 26.68 ± 0.25 ly.

The most accurate estimate is marked in bold.

Physical parameters

WD 2359−434's mass is 0.85 ± 0.01 Solar masses, its surface gravity is 108.39 ± 0.01 (2.45 · 108) cm·s−2, or approximately 250,000 of Earth's, corresponding to a radius 6780 km, or 1.06 of Earth's.

WD 2359−434 is relatively hot and young white dwarf, its temperature is 8570 ± 50 K; its cooling age, i. e. age as degenerate star (not including lifetime as main sequence star and as giant star) is 1.82 ± 0.06 Gyr. Gliese 518 should appear bluish-white, due temperature, comparable with that of A-type main sequence stars.

As all white dwarfs, WD 2359−434 is composed of very dense degenerate matter, its mean density is 1,300,000 g·cm−3, i.e. mass of one cubic millimetre of WD 2359−434 matter is 1.3 kg.

Unusually for a white dwarf star, WD 2359-434 has a weak, non-dipole magnetic field of 50,000 - 100,000 Gauss.

Main sequence progenitor properties

As all degenerate stars, WD 2359−434 previously existed initially as main-sequence star and then as giant star, until all the thermonuclear fuel was exhausted, after which WD 2359−434 lost most of its mass. Using expression for pre-white dwarf lifetime 10 · (MMS/)2.5 (Gyr), was found WD 2359−434 main sequence age 0.07 Gyr.

White dwarf mass value  from Subasavage et al. 2009, in Wood model D yields MS (main sequence) mass , and MS lifetime 0.11 Gyr, corresponding to B-type main sequence star.

There are also other models.

See also
 List of star systems within 25–30 light-years

Notes

References

White dwarfs
Phoenix (constellation)
0915
J00021076-430956